Anton Szandor LaVey (born Howard Stanton Levey; April 11, 1930 – October 29, 1997) was an American author, musician, and Satanist. He was the founder of the Church of Satan and the religion of Satanism. He authored several books, including The Satanic Bible, The Satanic Rituals, The Satanic Witch, The Devil's Notebook, and Satan Speaks! In addition, he released three albums, including The Satanic Mass, Satan Takes a Holiday, and Strange Music. He played a minor on-screen role and served as technical advisor for the 1975 film The Devil's Rain and served as host and narrator for Nick Bougas' 1989 mondo film Death Scenes.

Historian of Satanism Gareth J. Medway described LaVey as a "born showman", with anthropologist Jean La Fontaine describing him as a "colourful figure of considerable personal magnetism". The academic scholars of Satanism Per Faxneld and Jesper Aagaard Petersen described LaVey as "the most iconic figure in the Satanic milieu". LaVey was labeled many things by journalists, religious detractors, and Satanists alike, including "The Father of Satanism", the "St. Paul of Satanism", "The Black Pope", and the "evilest man in the world".

Early life
LaVey was born Howard Stanton Levey on April 11, 1930 in Chicago, Illinois. His father, Michael Joseph Levey (1903–1992), from Chicago, married LaVey's mother, Gertrude Augusta née Coultron, born to a Georgian father and Ukrainian mother, both of whom immigrated to Ohio in 1893 and became naturalized American citizens in 1900. His parents supported his musical interests, as he tried a number of instruments; his favorites were keyboards such as the piano and accordion. Anton played piano in a Baptist church as a boy, and played oboe in high school. He attended Tamalpais High School in Mill Valley, California, until the age of 16. LaVey claimed he left high school at age 16 to join the Clyde Beatty Circus and later carnivals, first as a roustabout and cage boy in an act with the big cats, then as a musician playing the calliope. He played tunes such as "Harlem Nocturne" by Earle Hagen. LaVey later claimed to have seen that many of the same men attended both the bawdy Saturday night shows and the tent revival meetings on Sunday mornings, which reinforced his increasingly cynical view of religion. In the foreword to the German language edition of The Satanic Bible, he cites this as the impetus to defy Christian religion as he knew it. He explains why church-goers employ moral double standards. However, journalist Lawrence Wright investigated LaVey's background and found no evidence LaVey ever worked in a circus either as a musician or a cage boy.

In the winter of 1948, LaVey began to work as an organist in bars, lounges, and nightclubs. His "genius" on keyboards helped him attain gigs. While playing organ in Los Angeles burlesque houses, he allegedly had a brief affair with then-unknown Marilyn Monroe, when she was a dancer at the Mayan Theater. This is challenged by those who then knew Monroe, as well as the manager of the Mayan, Paul Valentine, who said she had never been one of his dancers, nor had the theater ever been used as a burlesque house.

According to his biography, LaVey moved back to San Francisco. In 1950, LaVey met Carole Lansing. They married the following year, when Lansing was fifteen years old. Lansing gave birth to LaVey's first daughter, Karla LaVey, born in 1952. In order to avoid the Korean War draft, he studied criminology at City College of San Francisco. LaVey then attained a job as a photographer for the San Francisco Police Department (SFPD), where he worked for three years. He dabbled as a psychic investigator, looking into "800 calls" referred to him by SFPD. Later biographers questioned whether LaVey ever worked with the SFPD, as there are no records substantiating the claim.

During this period, LaVey was friends with a number of writers associated with Weird Tales magazine; a picture of him with George Haas, Robert Barbour Johnson, and Clark Ashton Smith appears in Blanche Barton's biography The Secret Life of a Satanist.

LaVey and Carole divorced in 1960, after LaVey became involved with Diane Hegarty. Hegarty and LaVey never married, however she was his companion for 24 years and mothered his second daughter, Zeena Galatea Schreck (nee LaVey) (born in 1963). At the end of their relationship, Hegarty sued for palimony.

Church of Satan
Anton Lavey became a local celebrity in San Francisco through his paranormal research and live performances as an organist, including playing the Wurlitzer at the Lost Weekend cocktail lounge. He was also a publicly noticeable figure; he drove a coroner's van around town, and he walked his pet black leopard, named Zoltan. He attracted many San Francisco notables to his parties. Guests included Carin de Plessin, Michael Harner, Chester A. Arthur III, Forrest J Ackerman, Fritz Leiber, Cecil E. Nixon, and Kenneth Anger. LaVey formed a group called the Order of the Trapezoid, which later evolved into the governing body of the Church of Satan. According to Faxneld and Petersen, the Church of Satan represented "the first public, highly visible, and long-lasting organisation which propounded a coherent Satanic discourse".

LaVey began presenting Friday night lectures on the occult and rituals. A member of this circle suggested that he had the basis for a new religion. According to LaVey himself, on Walpurgisnacht, April 30, 1966, he ritualistically shaved his head, allegedly "in the tradition of ancient executioners", declared the founding of the Church of Satan and proclaimed 1966 as "the Year One", Anno Satanas, the first year of the Age of Satan (it was later demonstrated that LaVey in fact shaved his head because he lost a bet and made up the "ancient executioners" story after the fact). LaVey's image has been described as "Mephistophelian," and may have been inspired by an occult-themed episode of the television show The Wild Wild West titled "The Night of the Druid's Blood" which originally aired on March 25, 1966 and  starred Don Rickles as the evil
magician and Satanic cult leader Asmodeus, whose Mephistophelean persona is virtually identical to that which LaVey adopted one month later.  Media attention followed the subsequent Satanic wedding ceremony of journalist John Raymond to New York City socialite Judith Case on February 1, 1967. The Los Angeles Times and San Francisco Chronicle were among the newspapers that printed articles dubbing him "The Black Pope". LaVey performed Satanic baptisms (including the first Satanic baptism in history for his three-year-old daughter Zeena, dedicating her to Satan and the Left-Hand Path, which garnered worldwide publicity and was originally recorded on The Satanic Mass LP) and Satanic funerals (including one for naval Machinist-Repairman Third-Class Edward Olsen, complete with a chrome-helmeted honor guard), and released a record album entitled The Satanic Mass.

In the late 1960s and early 1970s, LaVey melded ideological influences from Friedrich Nietzsche, Ayn Rand, H. L. Mencken, and Social Darwinism with the ideology and ritual practices of the Church of Satan. He wrote essays introduced with reworked excerpts from Ragnar Redbeard's Might Is Right and concluded with "Satanized" versions of John Dee's Enochian Keys to create books such as The Complete Witch (re-released in 1989 as The Satanic Witch), and The Satanic Rituals. The latter book also included rituals drawing on the work of H. P. Lovecraft. Admitting his use of Might is Right, LaVey stated that he did so in order to "immortalize a writer who had profoundly reached me".

In 1972, the public work at LaVey's Black House in San Francisco was curtailed and work was continued via sanctioned regional "grottoes". In early 1975 LaVey announced that higher degrees of initiation could be given in return for a financial contribution. In June 1975, editor of the Church's newsletter, Michael Aquino, left the Church of Satan and formed the theistic Temple of Set, claiming to take an unknown number of dissenters with him. The Church maintains this policy announcement was designed to "clean house" of members who didn't understand Satanic philosophy.

Later life and death
In 1980 the FBI interviewed LaVey in connection with an alleged plot to murder Ted Kennedy. LaVey told the agents that most of the church's followers were "fanatics, cultists, and weirdos". The agents reported that LaVey’s "interest in the Church of Satan is strictly from a monetary point of view," and that he spent "most of his time furnishing interviews, writing material, and lately has become interested in photography."

In July 1984, Hegarty issued a restraining order against LaVey, which he did not contest. LaVey's third and final companion was Blanche Barton. On November 1, 1993, Barton gave birth to Satan Xerxes Carnacki LaVey. Barton succeeded LaVey as the head of the Church after his death and has since stepped down from that role and handed it to Magus Peter H. Gilmore.

According to his family, Anton LaVey died on October 29, 1997, in St. Mary's Medical Center in San Francisco of pulmonary edema; however, his death certificate lists October 31, 1997. He was taken to St. Mary's, a Catholic hospital, because it was the closest available. A secret Satanic funeral, attended by invitation only, was held in Colma, after which LaVey's body was cremated.

On February 2, 1998, his estranged daughter Zeena Schreck and her then husband Nikolas Schreck published a nine-page "fact sheet", in which they endorsed Wright's earlier allegations and claimed that many more of LaVey's stories about his life had been false.

Thought
LaVey included references to other esoteric and religious groups throughout his writings, claiming for instance that the Yezidis and Knight's Templar were carriers of a Satanic tradition that had been passed down to the twentieth-century. Scholar of Satanism Per Faxneld believed that these references were deliberately tongue-in-cheek and ironic, however he noted that many Satanists who had read LaVey's writings had taken them to be literal historical claims about the past. Although he regularly derided older esotericists, LaVey also relied upon their work; for instance making use of John Dee's Enochian system in The Satanic Bible. Faxneld therefore believed that there was a tension in LaVey's thought between his desire to establish prestigious Satanic predecessors and his desire to be seen as the founder of the first real Satanic society.

Dyrendel argued that LaVey partook in conspiracy culture as he grew older, for he was greatly concerned with modern society's impact on individual agency. LaVey was conservative in his attitude to law and order, and insisted that the Church abide by state law in all of its actions. He supported eugenics and believed that it would be a necessity in the future. LaVey hated rock and metal music, with or without "Satanic" lyrics, and often expressed his distaste for it.

Reception and legacy
Historian of Satanism Gareth J. Medway described LaVey as "A born showman", with anthropologist Jean La Fontaine describing him as "A colourful figure of considerable personal magnetism". Medway contrasted LaVey from the likes of Jim Jones, David Koresh, and Charles Manson, noting that whereas the latter were the charismatic leaders of apocalyptic communes, within the Church of Satan, "No one hung onto [LaVey's] every word, and church members [were] allowed considerable autonomy."

The academic scholars, Per Faxneld and Jesper Aagaard Petersen, described LaVey as "the most iconic figure in the Satanic milieu", while Asbjørn Dyrendel described him as "the founder of modern Satanism".
In his 2001 examination of Satanists, the sociologist James R. Lewis noted that, to his surprise, his findings "consistently pointed to the centrality of LaVey's influence on modern Satanism". As a result he "concluded that - despite his heavy dependence on prior thinkers - LaVey was directly responsible for the genesis of Satanism as a serious religious (as opposed to a purely literary) movement".

His books The Satanic Bible and The Satanic Rituals have been cited as having "an influence far beyond" the Church of Satan's membership. In 1995, the religious studies scholar Graham Harvey wrote that although the Church had no organized presence in Britain, LaVey's writings were widely accessible in British bookshops.

Due to increasing visibility through his books, LaVey was the subject of numerous articles in the news media throughout the world, including popular magazines such as Look, McCall's, Newsweek, and Time, and men's magazines. He also appeared on talk shows such as The Joe Pyne Show, Donahue, and The Tonight Show, and in a feature-length documentary called Satanis in 1970. He would be credited for the mainstreaming of Satanism and witchcraft in the U.S. during the 1960s, 1970s, and after. LaVey claimed that he had been appointed consultant to the film Rosemary's Baby, which revolved around a group of fictional Satanists, and that he also had a cameo appearance in the film as the Devil. However, critics have argued that none of this was true. In an article published in Rolling Stone magazine in 1991, the journalist Lawrence Wright revealed that through his own investigative work, he found that many of LaVey's claims about his life had been untrue. Two official biographies have been written on LaVey, including The Devil's Avenger by Burton H. Wolfe, published in 1974 and The Secret Life of a Satanist by Blanche Barton, published in 1990.

Politics
LaVey was a friend of James Madole, leader of the neo-fascist National Renaissance Party. Due to Madole's opposition to Christianity, he sought new religious ideas, and was attracted to an infusion of fascism and Satanism.

In popular culture
 In Season 8 of American Horror Story (American Horror Story: Apocalypse), Episode "Return To Murder House" (2018) LaVey is portrayed by Carlo Rota.
 In the feature film Polanski Unauthorized, where he is shown as an advisor on Polanski's movie Rosemary's Baby, LaVey is portrayed by Tom Druilhet.

LaVey-related books

Books by LaVey
 The Satanic Bible (1969) (Avon)
 The Satanic Rituals (1972) (Avon)
 The Satanic Witch (1989) (Feral House)
 The Devil's Notebook (1992) (Feral House)
 Satan Speaks! (1998) (Feral House)
 Letters from the Devil (2010) (Underworld Amusements)

Books featuring writings by LaVey
 "Misanthropia", Rants and Incendiary Tracts: Voices of Desperate Illuminations 1558-present!, edited by Bob Black and Adam Parfrey (Amok Press and Loompanics Unlimited, 1989)
 "The Invisible War", Apocalypse Culture: Expanded & revised edition, edited by Adam Parfrey (Amok Press, 1990)
 "Foreword", Might Is Right, or The Survival of the Fittest by Ragnar Redbeard, LL.D., edited by Katja Lane (M.H.P. & Co., Ltd, 1996)

Books about LaVey
Anton LaVey and the Church of Satan: Infernal Wisdom from the Devil's Den by Carl Abrahamsson (Inner Traditions, 2022).
 The Devil's Avenger: A Biography of Anton Szandor LaVey by Burton H. Wolfe (Pyramid Books, 1974, Out of print)
 The Black Pope by Burton H. Wolfe (a drastically revised and updated edition of The Devil's Avenger).
 The Secret Life Of A Satanist: The Authorized Biography of Anton LaVey by Blanche Barton (Feral House, 1990).
 Popular Witchcraft: Straight from the Witch's Mouth by Jack Fritscher ; featuring Anton LaVey (University of Wisconsin Press : Popular Press, 2004, hardcover, paperback)
 The 2009 play 'Debate' by Irish author Sean Ferrick features LaVey as a character. He is one of four witnesses in a case between God and The Devil, and events from both his life and after his death are used as evidence. He was portrayed by Mark O'Brien and Fiachra MacNamara
 Letters From the Devil: The Lost Writing of Anton Szandor LaVey by Anton Szandor LaVey, 2010, softcover, paperback 
 California Infernal: Anton LaVey & Jayne Mansfield: As Portrayed by Walter Fischer, 2017, hardcover

Recordings of Anton LaVey
 The Satanic Mass, LP (Murgenstrumm Records, 1968; re-released on CD with one bonus track, "Hymn of the Satanic Empire, or The Battle Hymn of the Apocalypse", by Amarillo Records, 1994; Mephisto Media, 2001)
 Answer Me/Honolulu Baby, 7" single (Amarillo Records, 1993)
 Strange Music, 10" EP (Amarillo Records, 1994; now available through Reptilian Records)
 Satan Takes A Holiday, CD (Amarillo Records, 1995; now available through Reptilian Records)
 Anton Szandor Lavey The Devil Speaks (& Plays), LP (2017; Aberrant Records Limited)

Films starring LaVey
 Speak of the Devil: The Canon of Anton LaVey, a documentary directed by Nick Bougas.
 Death Scenes, a mondo film directed by Nick Bougas.
 Invocation of My Demon Brother, directed by Kenneth Anger.
 The Devil's Rain, directed by Robert Fuest.
 Iconoclast, directed by Larry Wessel.
 An American Satan, directed by Aram Garriga.

See also
 Satanism
 Left-hand path
 Church of Satan
 LaVeyan Satanism
 Peter H. Gilmore
 The Satanic Bible
 Temple of Set
 Joy of Satan

References

Sources

External links

Writings by LaVey
 The Nine Satanic Statements
 The Eleven Satanic Rules of the Earth
 The Nine Satanic Sins
 Pentagonal Revisionism: A Five-Point Program, 1988
  The World's Most Powerful Religion
 Enochian Pronunciation Guide
 Letters From The Devil from The National Insider, Vol. 14, No. 17, April 27, 1969.
 On Occultism of the Past from The Cloven Hoof, September 1971 c.e., Volume Three, Number Nine.

Interviews with LaVey
 Section concerning Anton LaVey in Chapter XII (Satan in the Suburbs) of "Occult America" by John Godwin (Doubleday & Company, Inc., 1972)
 Section concerning Anton LaVey in "Everything You Ever Wanted to Know About Sorcery, But Were Afraid to Ask" by Arlene J. Fitzgerald (Manor Books, 1973)
 "Anton LaVey: America's Satanic Master of Devils, Magic, Music, and Madness" by Walt Harrington in "The Washington Post Magazine", February 23, 1986.
 "Anton LaVey / The Church of Satan Interview" by Eugene Robinson in "The Birth of Tragedy", No. 4 "The God Issue", November 1986 – January 1987
 "Dinner with the Devil: An evening with Anton Szandor LaVey, the High Priest of the Church of Satan" by Reverend Bob Johnson in "High Society", August 1994.
 "The Doctor is in......" by Shane & Amy Bugbee in "MF Magazine" #3, Summer 1997.
 Interview with Anton LaVey by Michelle Carr and Elvia Lahman, originally published in the September 11, 1997 Velvet Hammer souvenir programme.

About LaVey
 Anton Szandor LaVey: A Biographical Sketch by Magus Peter H. Gilmore, on the Church of Satan's official website.
 Anton Lavey by Alex Burns at disinformation.
 
 People of Significance entry for LaVey
 Short biographical sketch with particular focus on his influence on Marilyn Manson, taken from "Spin magazine" (February 1998, pg. 64).

1930 births
1997 deaths
American atheists
American eugenicists
American organists
American male organists
American people of Georgian (country) descent
American people of Ukrainian descent
American LaVeyan Satanists
Church of Satan
Deaths from pulmonary edema
Founders of new religious movements
People from San Francisco
Satanist religious leaders
Tamalpais High School alumni
Writers from Chicago
Writers from San Francisco
20th-century American musicians
20th-century American writers
Critics of Christianity
Critics of the Catholic Church
20th-century American male musicians
20th-century pseudonymous writers